Dyseriocrania is a genus of moth of the family Eriocraniidae.

Species
Dyseriocrania auricyanea (Walsingham, 1882)
Dyseriocrania subpurpurella (Haworth, 1828)
Dyseriocrania griseocapitella (Walsingham, 1898)

References

External links
 

Eriocraniidae
Moth genera
Glossata genera